Kapiʻolani (December 31, 1834 – June 24, 1899) was the queen of the Kingdom of Hawaiʻi as the consort of Mōʻī (king) Kalākaua, who reigned from 1874 to 1891 until Mōʻī's death when she became known as the Dowager Queen Kapiʻolani. Deeply interested in the health and welfare of Native Hawaiians, Kapiʻolani established the Kapiʻolani Home for Girls, for the education of the daughters of residents of the Kalaupapa Leprosy Settlement, and the Kapiʻolani Maternity Home, where Hawaiian mothers and newborns could receive care.

Early life and family 
Kapiʻolani was born December 31, 1834, in Hilo on Hawaiʻi Island to High Chief Kūhiō Kalanianaʻole of Hilo and High Chiefess Kinoiki Kekaulike of Kauaʻi, the daughter of King Kaumualiʻi, the last king of an independent Kauaʻi before its cession to Kamehameha the Great. Her two younger sisters were Kapoʻoloku Poʻomaikelani (1839–1895), who married Hiram Kahanawai, and Kinoiki Kekaulike (1843–1884), who married David Kahalepouli Piʻikoi.

Her full name was Kapiʻolani Napelakapuokakaʻe. Her namesake was her great-aunt High Chiefess Kapiʻolani, who plucked the ʻōhelo berries and openly defied the goddess Pele as a dramatic demonstration of her new faith in Christianity. Kapiʻolani is composed of three words (ka piʻo lani) and literally means "the arch [of] heaven (rainbows signified the presence of royalty)". Her secondary name, Napelakapuokakaʻe, translates to "the sacred flesh of Kakae".

She was raised in Hilo until the age of eight when she was sent to be raised in the district of Kona, on the western side of the island of Hawaiʻi. She went to Honolulu on Oʻahu when she was sixteen and came under the guardianship of King Kamehameha III.

Kapiʻolani was brought up to read and write in the Hawaiian language. Although she learned to understand a few English words and phrases, like many Native Hawaiians she never learned to speak it fluently and required a Hawaiian translator when communicating with English speakers. Kapiʻolani became a member of the Anglican Church of Hawaiʻi after it was established in 1862.

Marriage to Nāmākēhā 
On March 7, 1852, Kapiʻolani married High Chief Bennett Nāmākēhā, a member of the House of Nobles in Honolulu. She was almost eighteen years old, while her husband was thirty years her senior. He was an uncle of Queen Emma, the wife of Kamehameha IV, on her father George Naʻea's side. This made her aunt by marriage to Queen Emma, whom she served as her highest ranking lady-in-waiting. Nāmākēhā and Kapiʻolani had no children, although a pregnancy resulted in a miscarriage. For his health the couple voyaged on The Morning Star, a missionary vessel, for months among the Gilbert Islands (present day Kiribati) but in vain. Nāmākēhā died on December 27, 1860, at Honolulu.

Nāmākēhā and Kapiʻolani were appointed the caretakers of Prince Albert Kamehameha, the only child of Emma and Kamehameha IV. Kapiʻolani was the royal child's chief nurse. The prince died at the age of four, on August 27, 1862, possibly from appendicitis. Historian Helena G. Allen later claimed that Queen Emma blamed Kapiʻolani for the child's death. The prince was under Kapiʻolani's care when he was doused with cold water by the king to calm him during a tantrum. This was traditionally thought to have induced the brain fever which killed the prince. Historian George Kanahele concludes there is little to no evidence of this animosity. Queen Emma wrote Kapiʻolani a very kind reply in her March 1863 letter, "Dear Kapiʻolani, my companion in the caring of my son. You were my son's favorite, your chest must be filled with hurt. You were our third companion... ."

Visiting British dignitaries Jane, Lady Franklin and her niece Sophia Cracroft met "Madame Nāmākēhā" in June 1861. Cracroft wrote:

Queen of Hawaiʻi 
Kapiʻolani was remarried on December 19, 1863, to David Kalākaua in a quiet ceremony conducted by an Anglican minister. Their wedding was heavily criticized since it fell during the time of mourning for King Kamehameha IV.
Her second husband was an aspiring high chief and politician who served in the House of Nobles, the Privy Council of State and held many other court and government posts during the reigns of Kamehameha IV, Kamehameha V and Lunalilo. Although unsuccessful in his attempt for the throne in 1873, Kalākaua defeated Queen Dowager Emma to succeed Lunalilo as the monarch of Hawaiʻi on February 12, 1874. Kapiʻolani became queen consort of Hawaii upon the accession of her husband to the Hawaiian throne.
One of the couple's first acts was to conduct a royal progress of the Hawaiian Islands. From March to May 1874, they toured the main Hawaiian Islands of Kauaʻi, Maui, Hawaiʻi Island, Molokaʻi and Oʻahu. The royal pair were enthusiastically received by the people.

Their marriage remained childless. A clinical analysis into the cause of Kalākaua's death led to speculation that the king may have been infertile since Kapiʻolani had a miscarried pregnancy with her previous marriage. Thus, she and her sister Poʻomaikelani adopted, in the tradition of hānai, their sister Kekaulike's three sons. Kapiʻolani took David Kawānanakoa and Jonah Kūhiō Kalanianaʻole and Poʻomaikelani adopted Edward Abnel Keliʻiahonui. In 1883, Kalākaua made Kapiʻolani's nephews princes of Hawaiʻi with the style of Highness in honor of his coronation. After the death of Kekaulike in 1884, Kalākaua and Kapiʻolani assumed legal guardianship over all three boys.

Coronation

Kalākaua and Kapiʻolani were crowned in a coronation ceremony on February 12, 1883. They were denied this in 1874 because of the civil unrest following the election. Under Minister of Finance Walter M. Gibson, the 1880 legislature appropriated $10,000 for a coronation. The coronation ceremony and related celebratory events were spread out over a two-week period. A special octagon-shaped pavilion and grandstand were built for the February 12, 1883, ceremony. Preparations were made for an anticipated crowd exceeding 5,000, with lawn chairs to accommodate any overflow. Two crowns of gold and precious stones were commissioned in the United Kingdom, while the wardrobes of Kapiʻolani, the other royal ladies and their attendants were also ordered from abroad.

Kalākaua and Kapiʻolani, accompanied by their royal retinue, came out of the palace onto the event grounds. The coronation was preceded by a choir singing and the formal recitation of the King's official titles. The news coverage noted, "The King looked ill at ease". Chief Justice of Hawaii's Supreme Court Albert Francis Judd officiated and delivered the oath of office to the king. The crown was then handed to Kalākaua, and he placed it upon his head. Kalākaua then placed the smaller crown on Kapiʻolani and stated, "I place this crown upon your head to share the honours of my throne." According to a later apocryphal tale, the king had trouble fitting the crown on the queen's elaborate hair. Her ladies-in-waiting tried in vain to rearrange her hairpins and combs, but the crown still could not fit into place. Thus, the king impatiently jammed the crown onto her head causing her to wince in pain.

The ceremony ended with the choir singing, and a prayer. A planned post-coronation reception by Kalākaua and Kapiʻolani was cancelled without advance notice. Today, Kalākaua's coronation pavilion serves as the bandstand for the Royal Hawaiian Band.
That evening, the royal couple hosted a state dinner, and there was a luau at a later day. The hula was performed nightly on the palace grounds. Regattas, horse races and a number of events filled the celebration period. Due to weather conditions, the planned illumination of the palace and grounds on the day of the coronation happened a week later, and the public was invited to attend. Fireworks displays lit up the sky at the palace and at Punchbowl Crater. A grand ball was held the evening of February 20.

Medical philanthropy 
Kapiʻolani shared in her husband Kalākaua's vision of Hoʻoulu Lāhui (increasing the nation) and developed an interest in the health problems plaguing the Hawaiian population at the time. She established the Kapiʻolani Maternity Home, where Hawaiian mothers, as well as their newborn babies, could receive care.

Kapiʻolani frequently visited Kakaʻako Branch Hospital on Oʻahu, which served as a receiving station for leprosy patients from all over the islands, and befriended Mother Marianne Cope and the other Sisters of Saint Francis. Sister Leopoldina Burns later described how the queen would sit with the sisters drinking coffee and attempting to learn each other's languages.

On July 21, 1884, Kapiʻolani visited the Kalaupapa Leper Settlement on Molokaʻi. Accompanying her was her sister-in-law Princess Liliʻuokalani, the latter's husband John Owen Dominis, and Dr. Eduard Arning. The queen met Father Damien, the Belgian priest who had been caring for the patients for the last decade, and was given a tour of the peninsula including the every homes of the afflicted by luna (resident superintendent) and patient Ambrose K. Hutchison. One of the concerns Hutchison brought to the queen's attention included the welfare of non-leprous children living on the island born to couples with leprosy. Kapiʻolani promised to build a home for these children. After the royal visit, the patients' living conditions improved significantly.

On November 9, 1885, the Kapiʻolani Home for Girls at Kakaʻako was founded for the education of daughters of parents with leprosy with funds raised by the queen's charitable organization. Kalākaua and Kapiʻolani officiated at the dedication ceremony along with Walter Murray Gibson, who was also the president of the Board of Health. During the ceremony, the queen unlocked the doors of the home and presented the key to Mother Marianne Cope. On the same occasion, Cope was decorated with the Royal Order of Kapiʻolani by the king for her service to Hawaiians afflicted with leprosy.

Golden Jubilee of Queen Victoria 

In April 1887, Kalākaua sent a delegation to attend the Golden Jubilee of Queen Victoria in London. It included Kapiʻolani, Princess Liliʻuokalani and Liliʻuokalani's husband John Owen Dominis, as well as Court Chamberlain Colonel Curtis P. Iʻaukea acting as the king's official envoy of the King and Colonel James Harbottle Boyd acting as aide-de-camp to the Queen.

The party landed in San Francisco and traveled across the United States visiting Washington, D.C., Boston and New York City, where they boarded a ship for the United Kingdom. While in the American capital, they were received by President Grover Cleveland and his wife Frances.

In London, Kapiʻolani and Liliʻuokalani were granted an audience with Queen Victoria at Buckingham Palace. She greeted both Hawaiian royals with affection and recalled Kalākaua's visit in 1881. They attended the special Jubilee service at Westminster Abbey and were seated with other foreign royal guests, and with members of the Royal Household. Kapiʻolani wore a peacock feathered dress design by her Special Equerry James Washington Lonoikauoalii McGuire.

Shortly after the Jubilee celebrations, they learned of political unrest in Hawaii. Under the threat of death, Kalākaua was forced to sign the Bayonet Constitution which limited the power of the monarch and increased the influence of Euro-American interests in the government. The royal party canceled their tour of Europe and returned to Hawaii.

Widowhood, death and funeral 
In declining health, Kalākaua traveled to California aboard the USS Charleston on November 25, 1890. While traveling, the king suffered a stroke in Santa Barbara and was rushed back to San Francisco. He died two days later on January 20. The news of Kalākaua's death did not reach Hawaiʻi until January 29 when the Charleston returned to Honolulu with the king's remains. In Kalākaua's will drafted in 1888, he left all his private property to Kapiʻolani. A proposed line of succession also stated placed Kapiʻolani third-in-line to the throne after Liliʻuokalani and their niece Princess Kaʻiulani with a provision that Kapiʻolani would serve as a regent in the case that Kaʻiulani ascended before reaching the age of majority.

After the death of her husband and the accession of her sister-in-law Liliʻuokalani to the throne, Queen Dowager Kapiʻolani retired from public life and seldom attended formal social events. Liliʻuokalani ruled for two years before she was overthrown, on January17, 1893. After a brief transition under the Provisional Government, the oligarchical Republic of Hawaiʻi was established on July4, 1894, with Sanford B. Dole as president. During this period, the defacto government, which was composed largely of residents of American and European ancestry, sought to annex the islands to the United States against the wishes of the Native Hawaiians who wanted to remain an independent nation ruled by the monarchy.
Kapiʻolani lived out the remainder of her life at her private residence Pualeilani in Waikīkī where the Hyatt Regency Waikiki now stands. Prior to her final illness, she signed over her vast landholdings worth over $250,000 to her nephews Prince Kawānanakoa and Prince Kūhiō. Her health began to fail two years before her death, and she suffered three strokes over this period. During her last days, she was in a comatose state and died on June 24, 1899, at age sixty-four.

Hawaii was annexed to the United States under the Newlands Resolution, a joint resolution of Congress, on August 12, 1898, but the territorial government was not formally established until April 30, 1900. Thus, the Republic of Hawaii's Minister of Foreign Affairs Ernest Augustus Mott-Smith announced the royal funeral to the foreign consular agents in Honolulu. Her body lay in state at Kawaiahaʻo Church for public viewing and her funerary services were performed by the Anglican Bishop Alfred Willis at 2:00 pm on July 2. After the service, a state funeral procession brought her remains for burial at the Royal Mausoleum of Hawaii at Mauna ʻAla. Included among the members of Hawaiian society at her funeral procession were the former royal family: her nephews Prince Kawānanakoa and Prince Kūhiō, her brother-in-law Archibald Scott Cleghorn and her sister-in-law Liliʻuokalani. Officials of the Republic of Hawaii including Sanford B. Dole (still referred to as president) and members of the United States Army and Navy also attended the procession. She was interred in the mausoleum joining her husband and the rest of the House of Kalākaua. In a ceremony officiated by Liliʻuokalani on June 24, 1910, her remains, and those of her husband's family, were transferred for a final time to the underground Kalākaua Crypt after the main mausoleum building had been converted into a chapel.

Legacy 
Her medical legacy Kapiʻolani Maternity Home survives today as the Kapiʻolani Medical Center for Women and Children. Kapiʻolani Park in Waikīkī was named after the Queen by her husband Kalākaua. She is also the namesake of Kapiʻolani Boulevard, Kapiʻolani Community College and numerous businesses in Honolulu. One of her noted contributions to Hawaiian music was a love song she composed for her husband, "Ka Ipo Lei Manu". Kalākaua died in San Francisco before he could hear the song from his queen.

A portrait of Queen Kapiʻolani painted in August 1884 by Charles Furneaux, hangs at ʻIolani Palace.

Notes

References

Bibliography

Books and journals

Newspapers and online sources

Further reading 
 
 
 Kapiolani, Queen. Papers, 1834–1899. M-82, Manuscript Collection Inventory. Hawaii State Archives.

External links 

 
 
 
 
 
 

|-

1834 births
1899 deaths
Hawaiian queens consort
House of Kalākaua
Hawaiian royal consorts
Hawaiian ladies-in-waiting
Burials at the Royal Mausoleum (Mauna ʻAla)
People from Hilo, Hawaii
Recipients of the Royal Order of Kalākaua
Recipients of the Royal Order of Kapiolani
Grand Cordons of the Order of the Precious Crown
Grand Crosses of the Order of St. Sava
Hawaiian Kingdom Anglicans
Women who experienced pregnancy loss